Mansurabad (also Romanized as Manşūrābād) is a village in Sahandabad Rural District, Tekmeh Dash District, Bostanabad County, East Azerbaijan Province, Iran. At the 2006 census, its population was 130, in 30 families.

References 

Populated places in Bostanabad County